The London Ontario Live Arts Festival also known as LOLA Fest, was an arts festival which took place in downtown London, Ontario, Canada, in the third week of September, from 2006 to 2010. It began as a one-day street festival in 2006 and expanded to the three-day format in 2007. The festival was founded by Andrew Francis; LOLA 2007 and LOLA 2008 were curated by Ian Doig-Phaneuf (music) and Paul Walde (visual art).

LOLA was an imaginative live arts festival with contributions from well-known and emerging artists; it included large-scale projections on building exteriors, outdoor advertising space, neon signage, street theatre and generative art projects by international artists, plus interactive drama, musical and dance performances, and the involvement of major organizations from around the country.

Featured Artists
LOLA Fest 2006:  September 23

LOLA Fest 2007:  September 20, 21, 22

LOLA Fest 2008:  September 18, 19, 20, 21

LOLA Fest 2009:  September 17, 18, 19, 20

LOLA Fest 2010:  September 16, 17, 18, 19

References

Theatre festivals in Ontario
Festivals in London, Ontario
Dance festivals in Canada
Music festivals in Ontario